Alex Kahn is an American visual/performance artist and co-founder of the arts ensemble Processional Arts Workshop. He is most widely known for his creation of the large-scale puppet performance works that lead New York's Village Halloween Parade each year.

Pageant puppetry and processional art

In 1998, Kahn and his partner, Sophia Michahelles, brought together an ensemble of artists, puppeteers, theatrical technicians, and performers to design the annual performances that lead New York's Village Halloween Parade. Originally named "Superior Concept Monsters", the group was incorporated as a non-profit in 2005 and renamed Processional Arts Workshop with a mission to create site-specific community-built processions, parades, and other open-space performances.  These works are often developed through open community workshops that bring hundreds of volunteers together to build, rehearse, and ultimately perform cyclical pieces specifically for the parade. The performances typically incorporate elements of puppetry, sound, dance, costume/mask, lighting/projection and mobile architecture, an amalgam of mediums Kahn dubbed "processional art".

In addition to leading New York's Village Halloween Parade each year, Kahn's creations have appeared in venues nationally and internationally. His work, Metamorphosis, involving 20' tall pupating luna moths, officially opened the 2000 Henson International Festival of Puppet Theatre. In 2002, he and Michahelles initiated a midsummer pageant project in the Italian Alps village of Morinesio, drawing on local folklore and oral history to create a unique site-specific pageant. Inspired by the success of the now-annual tradition, they have seeded similar projects in diverse locales in Ukraine, Turkey, Italy, Texas, New York, and elsewhere. In 2006, Kahn was awarded a Fulbright Scholarship to Trinidad and Tobago, to study the artistic and cultural structures behind Caribbean Carnival and Trinidadian "Mas'", or costumed procession. More recent PAW works have included major commissions for Socrates Sculpture Park the NY Architectural League's Beaux Arts Ball, the PEN World Voices Festival, Houston's Buffalo Bayou Park, the Grand Opening of the High Line over Penn Rail Yards.

Other works

Kahn has maintained an independent practice as a theatrical designer, printmaker, installation artist, and teacher. His interdisciplinary approach was strongly influenced by his experience as technical director of the Kitchen Performance Center during the 1990s. During this time he created lighting, objects, and effects for performance artists including John Jesurun ("Chang in a Void Moon"), Mikel Rouse ("Failing Kansas"), Roseanne Spradlin, Meredith Monk, Pauline Oliveros, and David Hykes. Kahn trained as a master printer under Robert Blackburn (artist)  and chaired the Printmaking Department at Maine College of Art from 2000 to 2004. His Spam Cantos, a retooling of spam messages generated by Baysean algorithms into a series of letterpress poems, appeared at the Maine Institute of Contemporary Art in 2008. In 2016, Kahn performed in the role of "choir-master" in "The Visitors" a video-work by Icelandic artist Ragnar Kjartansson, which has appeared at major museums around the world. His ongoing project, a fictional traveling museum called the Archive of the Synapse, has been exhibited nationally. San Francisco Chronicle art critic Kenneth Baker described the work as follows:

References

 "The Greatest Free Show on Earth: Carnival from Trinidad to Brazil, Cape Town to New Orleans" Claire Tancons. From exhibition catalogue for "Prospect 1: New Orleans" (PictureBox, 2008)
 Puppetry International: Mega-Puppets Issue (Fall/Winter 2007-8) – "Greenwich Village Halloween" article by Rolande DuPree.
 Trinidad Guardian (4/25/06) – “Puppeteers Find That Cultural Link” by Kayode James
 La Guida (6/13/03) – “I Puppazzi gigante di Morinesio” by Massimiliano Cavallo
 Middletown Times Herald-Record (2/23/03) – “It Takes a Community to Build a Puppet”  by Deborah J. Botti
 Harvard Magazine (Jan/Feb 03) – “Community Puppeteer”  by Ellenor J. Honig
 Art New England  (Feb/March 2) –  “Light Upon Light: Towers of Remembrance” by Chris Thompson
 Portland Phoenix (10/26/00) – “Gathering Intelligence” by Chris Thompson
 Teokikixtli - Mexican Review of Puppet Arts (July 1)  – ”The Mysterious Life of Giant Puppets” by Sophia Michahelles
 New York Times (11/1/ 00) –  “Night of the Living Dot-Com” by Shaila Dewan
 NyTeknik (11/00) –  “Halloween årets rysare”  by Jan Aschan.  Swedish technical journal – feature article on puppetry works
 San Francisco Chronicle (8/19/00) –  “Artists Create Show at Refusalon’s ‘1:1’ ” review by Kenneth Baker
 Chronogram  (September 00) –  “Pulling Strings: Hudson Valley Puppetry Renaissance” by Pauline Uchmanowicz
 New York Times (11/1/98) –  photo from performance work

External links
 Official website for Processional Arts Workshop
 Video compilation of PAW works
 Official website for Archive of the Synapse
 Official website for New York's Village Halloween Parade
  WFUV Radio "Cityscape": documentary feature on Superior Concept Monsters

Living people
American artists
Jewish American artists
Artists from New York (state)
American puppeteers
Puppet designers
21st-century American Jews
Year of birth missing (living people)
Fulbright alumni